The Morane-Saulnier Alcyon (en: Kingfisher) is a two or three-seat basic training monoplane designed and built in France by Morane-Saulnier.

Design and development
Designed as a basic trainer for the French military the prototype MS.730 first flew on 11 August 1949. The prototype was a low-wing cantilever monoplane with a fixed tailwheel landing gear and powered by a  Mathis 8G.20 inverted V8 engine. The engine was replaced with a German war-surplus  Argus As 10 and the prototype flew again in November 1949 as the MS.731. Two further prototypes were built and flown in 1951 designated MS.732, they were each powered by a Potez 6D 02 engine and the original fixed landing gear of the prototype was replaced with retractable main wheels.

Operational history

The production version that followed was designated the MS.733, with five pre-production aircraft and 200 production aircraft. The aircraft were delivered to the French Navy (40), the French Air Force (145) and the Cambodian Air Force (15). Seventy of the French Air Force aircraft were fitted with machine guns for gunnery training and some of these were later converted for counter-insurgency operations (and re-designated MS.733A) for use in Algeria. After the war, some aircraft were sold to Morocco.

The Alcyon was a successful trainer, capable of basic aerobatic maneuvers. It was often used in replacement of pre-war vintage Stampe SV.4 biplanes. Several civilian flying schools, including Air France, used the Alcyon. For the time, it was well equipped with full IFR equipment: two VOR-ILS sets, one ADF set, two VHF radios, a radar altimeter, an attitude indicator, and a directional gyroscope. For this reason, it was often used for navigation training as it was far cheaper to operate than the twin-engine designs commonly used for that task.

Since retirement by the French military services, several Alcyons have been restored to flying condition in France by private pilot owners and groups.

Variants
MS.730
Prototype powered by a  Mathis 8G.20 engine, one built later re-engined as the MS.731.
MS.731
Prototype re-engined with a  Argus As 10 engine.
MS.732
Prototypes powered by a  Salmson 8.AS.02 engine and retractable landing gear, two built.
MS.733
Production variant with a  Potez 6D 02 engine, five pre-production and 200 production aircraft built.
MS.733A
MS.733 gunnery trainers modified for counter-insurgency role; it served from 1955 to 1959. It was replaced by the T-28S Fennec  
The COIN upgrade included a SFOM 83 reflector sight (suspended from the cockpit roof), two x 7.5mm MAC 1934/M39 machine guns in the wings (with 500 rounds each), and two under-wing hardpoints. 
Typical hardpoint loadout used paired Matra Type 14 rocket rails, which held four (stacked 2 x 2) SERAM  T10 heavy rockets and had a smaller hardpoint between the rocket rails rated for a  bomb.
MS.735
Powered by  supercharged Potez 6D 30 engine.

Operators

Cambodian Air Force: 15 MS.733A aircraft were sold to Cambodia for training and COIN duties. 

French Air Force: 145 MS.733 trainer aircraft. Several were converted to MS.733A COIN models; after the Algerian War they were either sold or converted back to MS.733 trainers. 
French Navy: 40 MS.733 trainer aircraft. They did not have carrier landing equipment because they were used exclusively at land bases.
Air France: Five civilianized MS.733 models were bought as single-engine trainers.  

Khmer Air Force

Moroccan Air Force: Bought several MS.733A aircraft for COIN duties.

Specifications (MS.733)

See also

References

Notes

Bibliography
 Bridgman, Leonard, ed. Jane's All The World's Aircraft 1951–52. London: Sampson Low, Marston & Company, Ltd. 1951
 Bridgman, Leonard, ed. Jane's All The World's Aircraft 1953–54. London: Jane's All The World's Aircraft Publishing Co., 1953.
 The Illustrated Encyclopedia of Aircraft (Part Work 1982-1985). London: Orbis Publishing, 1985.
 Taylor, Michael J. H. Jane's Encyclopedia of Aviation. London: Studio Editions. 1989. .

Further reading

External links

 Morane-Saulnier MS.733 Alcyon
 M.S.733 Alcyon

1940s French military trainer aircraft
Alcyon
Low-wing aircraft
Single-engined tractor aircraft
Aircraft first flown in 1949